Mathew Peter Dowman (born 10 May 1974) is a retired English cricketer. Born in Grantham, Dowman was a left-handed batsman and a right-arm medium-fast bowler.

Having started his career at Under-19 level, and including at this stage in his career a top score of 267 for England under-19s against the West Indies in Hove in 1993, at that point a youth "Test" record. A year later he started playing for Nottinghamshire.

Having a successful spell at the team, including a county high score of 149 against Leicestershire, and best bowling figures of 3/10, he continued to play first-class cricket until 2002, including a spell with Derbyshire near the end of his career.

He continued to play Minor Counties cricket for Lincolnshire and built up a steady playing partnership with Paul Pollard during Lincolnshire's Minor Counties Championship win in 2003.

External links 
 Mathew Dowman at Cricket-Online

1974 births
Living people
English cricketers
Nottinghamshire cricketers
Derbyshire cricketers
People from Grantham
Lincolnshire cricketers